In Greek mythology, Aeolus was a son of Poseidon by Arne, daughter of Aeolus (son of Hellen). He had a twin brother named Boeotus.

Mythology 
Arne confessed to her father that she was with child by the god Poseidon; her father, however, did not believe her, and handed her over to a man named Metapontus, King of Icaria. When Bœotus and Aeolus were born, they were raised by Metapontus; but their stepmother Autolyte (wife of Metapontus) quarreled with their mother Arne, prompting Bœotus and Aeolus to kill Autolyte and flee from Icaria. Bœotus, accompanied by Arne, went to southern Thessaly, and founded Boeotia; but Aeolus went to a group of islands in the Tyrrhenian Sea, which received from him the name of the Aeolian Islands. According to some accounts this Aeolus founded the town of Lipara. Although his home has been traditionally identified as one of the Aeolian Islands (there is little consensus as to which), near Sicily, an alternative location has been suggested at Gramvousa off the northwest coast of Crete.

Notes

References 

 Gaius Julius Hyginus, Fabulae from The Myths of Hyginus translated and edited by Mary Grant. University of Kansas Publications in Humanistic Studies. Online version at the Topos Text Project.
 Lucius Mestrius Plutarchus, Moralia with an English Translation by Frank Cole Babbitt. Cambridge, MA. Harvard University Press. London. William Heinemann Ltd. 1936. Online version at the Perseus Digital Library. Greek text available from the same website.
 Publius Ovidius Naso, The Epistles of Ovid. London. J. Nunn, Great-Queen-Street; R. Priestly, 143, High-Holborn; R. Lea, Greek-Street, Soho; and J. Rodwell, New-Bond-Street. 1813. Online version at the Perseus Digital Library.

Children of Poseidon